John Spadavecchia is an American professional poker player from Lighthouse Point, Florida.

Spadavecchia has been a regular on the poker tournament circuit since the 1980s, with his first finish in the money of a World Series of Poker (WSOP) event coming in the 1988 World Series of Poker in the $10,000 no limit Texas hold 'em main event where he finished 28th, earning him $8,750.

World Series of Poker bracelets

Poker career
Spadavecchia has cashed in a total of three World Series of Poker main events, the first coming in 1988. The second cash was in 1994 where he made the final table, placing third, earning him $294,000.  The third came in 2007 where he placed 60th, earning him $154,194.

He has cashed in the WSOP events more than two dozen times.  Spadavecchia won his bracelet in the 1991 WSOP, defeating three-time bracelet winner Dewey Tomko, to win the title and $58,500 cash prize.  He came close to winning a second bracelet in 1995 in the $2,500 Seven Card Stud event, but lost to Dan Robison in the heads-up play.

He has  cashed in the World Series of Poker Circuit Events a total of seven times, including two first-place finishes, for a total of $791,796.  That figure puts him third on the all-time total WSOP circuit event earnings list. His biggest career win came in the 2005/2006 WSOP Circuit Event - Caesars Palace no limit hold 'em $10,000 buy-in Championship.  There he placed first, earning him $648,320.  That win qualified him to play in the 2006 World Series of Poker Tournament of Champions.

As of 2009, his total live tournament winnings exceed $2,500,000. His 26 cashes at the WSOP account for $1,104,613 of those winnings.

Notes

American poker players
Living people
World Series of Poker bracelet winners
World Series of Poker Circuit event winners
Year of birth missing (living people)
Super Bowl of Poker event winners
People from Lighthouse Point, Florida
Sportspeople from Broward County, Florida